Mjölkudden is a residential area in Luleå, Sweden. It had 3,626 inhabitants in 2010.

References

External links
Mjölkudden at Luleå Municipality

Luleå